CDfs is a virtual file system for Unix-like operating systems; it provides access to data and audio tracks on Compact Discs. When the CDfs driver mounts a Compact Disc, it represents each track as a file. This is consistent with the Unix convention "everything is a file".

CDfs supports the following track types:

 Red Book Compact Disc Digital Audio (CD-DA): Appears as a WAV file; reading from it initiates DAE ripping.
 White Book Video CD or Super Video CD video: Appears as a playable MPEG-1 file containing audio and video streams.
 Yellow Book CD-ROM data:
 Hierarchical File System: Appears as a mountable HFS file system disk image (sans partition table).
 ISO 9660: Each session appears as a mountable ISO image file.
 El Torito boot file: Appears as a single bootable disk image file.

Implementations
The Linux version of the CDfs driver is not part of the mainline Linux kernel.

In the implementation for the operating system Plan 9 from Bell Labs, cdfs is a server that runs in user space via the 9P protocol. It represents the mounted disc as a directory of files named by track number. Plan 9's CDfs can also write to the disc.

External links

 CDfs patches
 Plan 9 cdfs manual page

Free special-purpose file systems
File systems supported by the Linux kernel
Third-party Linux kernel modules